Laurette is an unincorporated community in McLean County, in the U.S. state of Illinois.

History
Laurette derives its name from Laura, the wife of a railroad official.

References

Unincorporated communities in McLean County, Illinois
Unincorporated communities in Illinois